Zorak is a village in the Masis Municipality of the Ararat Province of Armenia. The village was mainly populated by Azerbaijanis before the exodus of Azerbaijanis from Armenia after the outbreak of the Nagorno-Karabakh conflict. In 1988-1989 Armenian refugees from Azerbaijan settled in the village.

References

External links 

World Gazeteer: Armenia – World-Gazetteer.com
Report of the results of the 2001 Armenian Census

Populated places in Ararat Province